Sigurd Erik "Sigge" Bröms (1 October 1932 – 13 January 2007) was a Swedish ice hockey center and Olympian.

Bröms played with Team Sweden at the 1956 Winter Olympics held in Cortina d'Ampezzo, Italy. He also played for Leksands IF in the Swedish Elite League.

References

1932 births
2007 deaths
Ice hockey players at the 1956 Winter Olympics
Ice hockey players at the 1960 Winter Olympics
Leksands IF players
Olympic ice hockey players of Sweden
People from Leksand Municipality
Swedish ice hockey centres
Sportspeople from Dalarna County